Bandar bin Saud Al Saud ( Bandar ibn Su'ūd ibn 'Abd al 'Azīz Āl Su'ūd; 2 January 1926 – 17 March 2016) was the eighth son of King Saud. He was born on the same day his grandfather, King Abdulaziz, entered and joined the city and province of Qunfudah to his realm.

Early life and education
Born in Riyadh on 2 January 1926 Bandar was the son of King Saud and Nayla. He studied at the school of princes and at other schools in Riyadh finishing his complementary studies in 1944 before graduating from high school in 1948. He then went to university in Turkey, graduating in 1952.

Career
Prince Bandar returned in early 1952 to Saudi Arabia when his father was crown prince. He was assigned to the interior ministry. A few years later, in 1956, then Crown Prince Faisal bin Abdulaziz Al Saud appointed him as an adviser to the royal court; a position he held until his retirement in 1981.

Personal life and death
Prince Bandar had three children: Prince Faisal, Princess Noura, and Princess Jawzaa.

Prince Bandar bin Saud died in Madrid on 17 March 2016 at age 90.

References

Bandar
1926 births
2016 deaths
Bandar
Bandar